The  are a collection of governing rules compiled in 668AD, hence being the first collection of Ritsuryō laws in classical Japan. These laws were compiled by Fujiwara no Kamatari under the order of Emperor Tenji. This collection of laws is now lost and its disputed existence is supported only by short references in later documents (among which the Tōshi Kaden, a history of the Fujiwara).
It is furthermore missing from the Nihon Shoki.

The Ōmi-ryō, consisting of 22 volumes, was promulgated in the last year of Tenji's reign. This legal codification is no longer extant, but it is said to have been refined in what is known as the Asuka Kiyomihara ritsu-ryō of 689; and these are understood to have been a forerunner of the Taihō ritsu-ryō of 701.

See also
 Ritsuryō
 Taihō Code
 Yōrō Code
 Asuka Kiyomihara Code

Notes

References
 Ponsonby-Fane, Richard Arthur Brabazon. (1959).  The Imperial House of Japan. Kyoto: Ponsonby Memorial Society. OCLC 194887
 Varley, H. Paul, ed. (1980). Kitabatake Chikafusa, 1359, Jinnō Shōtōki ("A Chronicle of Gods and Sovereigns: Jinnō Shōtōki of Kitabatake Chikafusa" translated by H. Paul Varley). New York: Columbia University Press.  .

7th century in Japan
Lost documents
Legal history of Japan
Legal codes
668
7th century in law
Emperor Tenji